Eriauchenus andrianampoinimerina is a species of spider in the family Archaeidae. It is endemic to Madagascar.

Taxonomy 
The holotype was collected by Hannah Wood and Nikolaj Schraff in the Montagne d’Anjanaharibe. The specific name commemorates King Andrianampoinimerina, who unified the Merina Kingdom. The genus name has also been incorrectly spelt "Eriauchenius".

Habitat and distribution 
The spider is found in Montagne d’Anjanaharibe, in montane rainforest, rainforest, and montane shrubland..

References 

Archaeidae
Spiders described in 2018